The 1915 college football season had no clear-cut champion, with the Official NCAA Division I Football Records Book listing Cornell, Minnesota, Oklahoma, and Pittsburgh as having been selected national champions in later years. Only Cornell (named by four major selectors) and Pittsburgh (named by one) claim national championships for the 1915 season.

Conference and program changes

Conference establishments
 The Southwest Intercollegiate Athletic Conference, later known as the Southwest Conference, began its first season of play in 1915. The league had eight founding members in Arkansas, Oklahoma, and Texas.
The Southern California Intercollegiate Athletic Conference, now a Division III conference, began football play in 1915.

Membership changes

Rose Bowl
The Rose Bowl was played for the first time since its inception on January 1, 1902, following the 1901 season. Washington State defeated Brown, 14–0. The game has been played annually ever since.

Conference standings

Major conference standings

Independents

Minor conferences

Minor conference standings

Awards and honors

All-Americans

The consensus All-America team included:

Statistical leaders
 Team scoring most points: Vanderbilt, 514 to 38.
 Player scoring most points: Jerry DaPrato, Michigan Agricultural, 185
 Player scoring most touchdowns: Jerry DaPrato, Michigan Agricultural, 34
 Player scoring most goals after touchdown: F. Parke Geyer, Oklahoma, 56
 Player scoring most field goals: William T. Van de Graaff, Alabama, 11
 Longest punt: Fritz Shiverick, Cornell, 86 yards, inclusive of roll of ball
 Longest run from kickoff: John Barrett, Washington & Lee, 101 yards
 Longest punt return: James DeHart, Pittsburgh, 105 yards
 Longest run from scrimmage: Dave Tayloe, North Carolina, and John R. Georgetown, 90 yards each

References